Artah (modern-day Reyhanlı) was a medieval town and castle located 25 miles east-northeast of Antioch, to the east of the Iron Bridge on the Roman road from Antioch to Aleppo.

History

After the loss of Syria to the Arabs during the 7th century, the Byzantine Empire reconquered Artah in 966 as a step to reconquer Antioch a few years later. Artah's importance came from its strategic position as it was situated on vital routes connecting the Euphrates and the Orontes valleys as well as Apamea, Aleppo and Antioch. Artah became then the residence of a strategos and was endowed, together with the nearby castle of 'Imm, with several imperial domains, making it thus attractive to Turkish raiders. Artah became a major stronghold in the Byzantine defenses in the region and the last Byzantine castle before the emirate of Aleppo. The town was conquered on 1 July 1068 by Aleppan forces, resulting in a massacre of the local population that had fled for safety to the town and indicating the weakening Byzantine defences in the region. The city was then shortly reconquered by Emperor Romanos IV Diogenes in December 1068 but by the time the army of the First Crusade reached it in October 1097, it was in the hand of local Turkmen rulers and was one of the keys to the success in the Crusaders' siege of Antioch. 

Ralph of Caen, in his Gesta Tancredi, described Artah as the "shield of Antioch" and Albert of Aachen describes it as "very well fortified with a wall and ramparts and a turreted fortress". From Marash, a detachment under Robert of Flanders went in October 1098 to the southwest to capture Artah. Robert's force numbered 1000 armed men. Their mission was aided by the Armenian Christian population that had defeated the Islamic garrison housed there and supplied the crusaders with food. The town was then briefly besieged by a force from Antioch but this force retreated upon arrival of the main crusader forces. After this, the crusaders moved via the Iron Bridge to Antioch and the town was most likely left to its inhabitants.

After the capture of Antioch, Bohemond of Tarento, who had contributed significantly to the fall of the city, founded the principality of Antioch and thus broke with the Byzantine Empire which had backed the crusaders. The new principality included next to Antioch the port St Simeon, Alexandretta and Artah. Artah became a bishopric in 1099 and in 1100 Bohemond decided to replace the Eastern Orthodox Patriarch of Antioch, John IV, due to his connection to the Byzantine Empire, with the newly appointed bishop of Artah, Bernard of Valence.

Two other major battles occurred at Artah during the Crusades. The first took place in 1105 between the forces of Tancred, Prince of Galilee, who was acting as regent for Bohemond, and Fakhr al-Mulk Radwan, the emir of Aleppo, in which the Crusaders were victorious.  The second, or Battle of Harim, was fought in 1164 in which a force of Latins were crushingly defeated by Nur ad-Din Zangi.

References 
Citations

Sources

 Runciman, Steven, A History of the Crusades, Volume I: The First Crusade and the Foundation of the Kingdom of Jerusalem, Cambridge University Press, Cambridge, 1951

Medieval Syria
Former populated places in Syria
Former populated places in Turkey
Principality of Antioch